Samuel Kwadwo Yamoah (born ) is a Ghanaian politician and was a member of the first parliament of the fourth Republic representing the Ahafo Ano North constituency in the Ashanti Region. He represented the National Democratic Congress.

Early life and education 
Yamoah was born on 16 May 1956 at Tepa in the Ashanti Region of Ghana. He attended the Osei Kyeretwie Secondary School where he obtained his GCE Ordinary Level.

Politics 
Yamoah was elected into parliament on the ticket of the National Democratic Congress for the Ahafo Ano North Constituency in the Ashanti Region of Ghana during the December 1992 Ghanaian parliamentary election. He was succeeded by Baffour Annor after serving for one term. During the 1996 Ghanaian general election, Baffour Annor polled 12,536 votes out of the total valid votes cast representing 45.70% over James Brownford Donkor of the New Patriotic Party who polled 9,628 votes representing 35.10% and Kwabena Nketia of the People's National Congress who polled 355 votes representing 1.30% of the total valid votes cast.

Career 
Aside politics, Yamoah is a businessman. He has had working experiences in banking, and building construction. He has also worked in the transportation industry, and served as a football coach.

Personal life 
Yamoah is a Christian and married.

References 

Living people
1956 births
National Democratic Congress (Ghana) politicians
People from Ashanti Region
Ghanaian businesspeople
Ghanaian Christians
Ghanaian MPs 1993–1997